Dobovlje (sometimes Dobovje) is a small settlement in the Municipality of Domžale in the Upper Carniola region of Slovenia.

History
Dobovlje was administratively separated from Brdo in 1992, when it was made a separate settlement. Additional territory was transferred to the settlement from Brdo in 2004.

References

External links 

Dobovlje on Geopedia

Populated places in the Municipality of Domžale